John Henry (November 1, 1800 – April 28, 1882) was a U.S. Representative from Illinois.

Born near Stanford, Kentucky, Henry attended the public schools. He served as a private in Captain Arnett's company of Illinois volunteers in the Black Hawk War. He served as a member of the State House of Representatives 1832–1840. He was prominently associated with the first railway being constructed in Illinois in 1838. He served as a member of the State Senate from 1840 to 1847. Following this, he served as the superintendent for the Illinois state insane asylum located in Jacksonville, Illinois.

Henry was elected as a Whig to the Twenty-ninth Congress to fill the vacancy caused by the resignation of Edward D. Baker and served from February 5, 1847, to March 3, 1847.  He was succeeded as Congressman by Abraham Lincoln.
He was not a candidate for the Thirtieth Congress.
He was superintendent of the state insane asylum at Jacksonville, Illinois from 1850 to 1855.
During the Civil War, he was connected with the Quartermaster's Department at Jackson, Tennessee, from August 25, 1862, to April 30, 1863.
He died on April 28, 1882, in St. Louis, Missouri, and was interred at Bellefontaine Cemetery.

External links

1800 births
1882 deaths
Members of the Illinois House of Representatives
Illinois state senators
Politicians from Springfield, Illinois
United States Army soldiers
Whig Party members of the United States House of Representatives from Illinois
19th-century American politicians